James Maxwell McCormick is an American speaker, author, and professional skydiver who is known for his expertise in intelligent risk-taking and innovation. He is founder of The Research Institute for Risk Intelligence, holds ten skydiving world records, and was a member of an international expedition that skydived to the North Pole. He served three years in the Reagan Administration in Washington, DC before returning to the private sector where, among other engagements, he served as Chief Operating Officer (COO) at design firm Anshen+Allen Architects.

Education
McCormick attended elementary, intermediate and high schools in Tustin, California.  He earned a bachelor's degree in civil engineering with an emphasis in construction management from the Viterbi School at the University of Southern California.

McCormick earned an MBA in finance and marketing from the Merage School of Business at the University of California, Irvine. He was keynote speaker at the school's commencement activities.

Career
After founding a small, Los Angeles-based trucking company, McCormick moved into real estate finance in Newport Beach, California.  He served three years in the Reagan Administration in Washington, DC and then returned to the private sector in southern California.  He served as vice president, Construction and Development for the Beckman Laser Institute and Medical Clinic and the University of California, Irvine and was responsible for funding and building the facility.   He then returned to real estate finance with Westmont Investment Company as vice president and project partner.  He was then recruited to serve as Chief Operating Officer by Anshen+Allen Architects, the fifth largest architectural firm in the United States. This was the last position he held before becoming a full-time speaker, author, coach, and consultant.

Government Service
McCormick served in the U.S. Department of Energy during Ronald Reagan's first term.  From 1981 to 1984, the positions he held included:
Special Assistant to the Assistant Secretary for Congressional, Intergovernmental and Public Affairs, Robert Odle
Aide to Secretary James B. Edwards
Staff Assistant to Secretary Donald P. Hodel
Special Assistant to the General Counsel (the first non-attorney in the department's history to hold this position)

Skydiving

McCormick is a Professional Exhibition Skydiver and has jumped into numerous public events, including the inaugural Opening Day at AT&T Park (then named Pacific Bell Park)<ref>"A Whole New Ball Game|Lore of New Park Yet to be Recorded," San Francisco Chronicle," April 12, 2000.  Accessed January 23, 2010</ref> in San Francisco when he delivered soil gathered from every major league baseball field to the new stadium.

On April 18, 1995, McCormick landed a parachute at the North Pole, after exiting an Ilyushin Il-76 jet aircraft flown from Khatanga, Siiberia.

On July 26, 1998, McCormick was a member of a team that set a world skydiving record above Skydive Chicago, in Ottawa, Illinois.  The team built a formation of 246 skydivers that we held for 7.25 seconds. Article entitled "The Evolution of Sport Skydiving" by Martin Myrtle. Accessed January 11, 2010 His second skydiving world record was earned on December 12, 2002, as a member of the Arizona Airspeed Skydive Arizona World Record team that build a formation of 300 skydivers.

On April 18, 2004, McCormick was a member of the Z-Team when it set a world record above Zephyrhills, Florida for the largest skydive consisting of two different formations.  That record was 121.  He was also a member of the American delegation to World Team 2006, the largest multi-national sports team ever assembled to pursue a common goal.  On February 8, 2006, World Team skydivers representing thirty-five countries successfully established the current world record by creating the largest skydiving formation ever built in the skies above Udon Thani, Thailand.  The record 2006 world record photographs, accessed January 12, 2010 was set when 400 World Team skydiving, exiting five C-130 Hercules military transports flying at 25,000 feet, linked together into a precisely designed formation in the colors and patterns of the Thai flag that existed for only 4.25 seconds.

In March 2007, Z-Team reconvened in Zephyrhills, Florida in an attempt to break their own world record established three years before.  On March 31, they succeeded when 139 skydivers built two different formations on one jump.

In 2008 McCormick was on a skydiving team that was featured in a television commercial for Honda Motors UK, titled "difficult is worth doing", in which the team formed three difficult and intricate formations.

On August 28, 2011, McCormick led a team of 69 skydivers that set a Colorado state record over Longmont for the largest formation. Denverpost.com story and photo, August 29, 2011. Accessed September 5, 2012. Accessed September 5, 2012. In the culmination of a three-year effort, the team created a snowflake formation.

On July 22 and 24, 2015 McCormick was one of the leaders of the Skydiving Hall of Fame Eagles that did the first large formation skydivesover the Experimental Aviation Association's AirVenture 2015 airshow. The team consisted of 108 skydivers plus four freefall videographers from 15 countries. "Skydivers to Make World-Record Attempts" theNorthwestern.com story by Michelle Dickmann, July 16, 2015. Accessed November 5, 2015. "Jim McCormick and Skydiving Hall of Fame Skydivers Go for World Record over EAA Oshkosh" EstesParkNews story. July 24, 2015. Story is on page 15 of the webfile. Accessed November 5, 2015. AirVenure is considered "the world's largest and most significant annual aviation events."

McCormick earned his ninth world record September 29, 2015 as a member of an international team jumping in Perris, California. "202 Skydivers Set Record for Largest Sequential Formation in Leap over Southern California" Associated Press story posted to Torontosun.com October 1, 2015. Accessed November 5, 2015. The team of 202 skydivers completed a jump consisting of two formations. The jump met the criteria of the Fédération Aéronautique Internationale for an aviation world record.

On January 30, McCormick participated in a formation of a Chinese character meaning "blessings from the sky" that included 48 skydivers at Skydive DeLand in Florida. It was commissioned by the Air Sports Federation of China and televised to an estimated billion people around the world as part of Chinese New Year celebrations.</ref>

Speaking
After returning from the skydiving expedition to the North Pole in 1995, McCormick became a professional speaker.  His activities have expanded to include organizational consulting, executive and performance coaching, and writing books and articles.  His book, The Power of Risk - How Intelligent Choices Will Make You More Successful was a 2009 finalist in the career category of the Next Generation Indie Book Awards. The First Time Manager '' was a finalist for the Management Book of the Year awards  from the Chartered Management Institute.

Published works
McCormick, Jim; Loren B. Belker; Gary S. Topchik (January 3, 2012). The First-Time Manager (6th ed.). AMACOM .
McCormick, Jim; Loren B. Belker; Gary S. Topchik (August 14, 2018) . The First-Time Manager (7th ed.). HarperCollins Publishing .

Notes

1956 births
Living people
USC Viterbi School of Engineering alumni
University of California, Irvine alumni